The Old Salt Lake was a historic site in coastal Southern California where sea salt was harvested for barter or sale.

History
The Old Salt Lake was used by the Chowigna band of Tongva who dug up salt from the bottom. In the 1700s, the Chowigna bartered salt from the old Redondo Salt Lake with other tribes. Their village by the lake was called Onoova-nga or “Place of Salt.”

Spanish Missionaries also dug up salt from the lake in the time of Spanish missions in California. 

On December 15, 1854 Manuel Dominguez sold  of the Rancho San Pedro for $500 to Los Angeles businessmen Henry Allanson and William Johnson. The Chowigna who lived near the lake were relocated to missions after the land sale.    

Johnson and Allanson built an evaporation pond and built a boiling house with 48 wood fired kettles to make salt faster than the evaporation pond. Johnson and Allanson exported much of the salt produced by transporting it  overland to the Port of San Pedro. 

Johnson and Allanson shut down the salt works in 1862 and sold it to businessman, Frances Mellus. Frances Mellus ran the Pacific Salt Works at the site until 1881. In 1881 Liverpool Salt Works at the Salton Sea, a rival company, purchased Pacific Salt Works and the closed. In 1901 the fire boiler were removed and the buildings were abandoned for almost 20 years; in 1924 all structures at the site were removed. 

The site of Old Salt Lake was designated a California Historic Landmark (No.373) on Sept. 6, 1941. 

Southern California Edison built the south Bay power plant on the site in 1948. 

In 1955 a granite marker was put up at the site on Harbor Drive near the AES electricity power plant. 

In 1998 AES Corporation purchased the power plant.

Markers
State Marker on the site reads:
NO. 373 OLD SALT LAKE - The Indians of this area obtained salt from this lake. Sometime in the 1850s, Johnson and Allanson erected the necessary works to manufacture salt by artificial as well as solar evaporation. The salt yield for 1879 was 450 tons."

 Native Daughters of the Golden West marker put up in 1955 by Tierra del Rey Parlor reads:This marker locates the site near which the Indians and early California settlers came to obtain their salt, which at many times was more valuable than gold.''

See also
California Historical Landmarks in Los Angeles County 
List of California Ranchos

References

California Historical Landmarks
1856 establishments in California
Redondo Beach, California
South Bay, Los Angeles
Tongva populated places
Wetlands and marshes of Los Angeles County, California